A grand union is a rail track junction where two double-track railway or tramway lines cross at grade, often in a street intersection or crossroads.  A total of sixteen railroad switches (sets of points) allow streetcars (or in rarer installations, trains) coming from any direction to take any of the three other directions. The same effect may be achieved with two adjacent wyes if the location allows for space.

Complexity
These types of complex junction are expensive to build and expensive to maintain. Special parts, sometimes made of manganese steel, are needed for each location where one rail crossed another (a "frog"); these parts often need to be custom-made and fitted for each single location, depending on the specific angle of crossing of the intersecting streets.

A full grand union junction consists of 88 frogs (where one rail crosses another rail), and 32 switchpoints (point blades) if single-point switches are not used.  A tram or train crossing the junction will encounter four or twenty frogs within the space of crossing the junction.

For all of the possible tracks of a grand union to be used during normal operation, at least six different tram routes have to cross the union. In an intersection with lines oriented towards cardinal directions, these could be: north-south, north-east, north-west, south-east, south-west, and east–west.

Three-quarter, half and butterfly unions 
Three-quarter unions are similar to grand unions in that they are also rail track junctions where two double-track railway lines cross at grade, often in a street intersection or crossroads; the primary difference being that one corner of the crossing does not have curved junction tracks, with the union having a total of 12 railroad switches (sets of points).

Half unions are similar, but have curved junction tracks on only two adjoining corners of the intersection, with a total of eight switches.

Butterfly unions share the total of eight switches, but the curved junction tracks are on opposing corners.

Examples

Europe

Austria
 Vienna has a three-quarter union at Quellenplatz, 48°10′32.3″N 16°22′24.7″E

Belgium
 Brussels has a grand union at carrefour Buyl - Général Jacques,  50°49′05.9″N 4°22′45.8″E

Croatia
 Zagreb has a grand union at the intersection of Savska and Vodnikova Street, 45.80545°N 15.96627°E, and a 3/4 union at the intersection of Vukovarska and Držićeva Avenue, 45.80113°N 15.999°E.

Czech Republic
 Brno, has a 3/4 union located at 49°12′16.24″N 16°37′25.54″E.
 Olomouc, has one grand union located at 49°35′44.42″N 17°14′50.27″E.
 Prague, has three grand unions, first at 50°6′12.65″N, 14°28′23.89″E the second at 50°5′55.94″N, 14°25′59.76″E. and the third at 50°4′23.19″N 14°24′50.30″E, this Grand Union was rebuilt in 2003 and has curved trackwork as the streets are not aligned at the river crossing.

Finland
 Helsinki has a 3/4 union at the intersection of Simonkatu and Mannerheimintie, 60.1699°N 24.9385°E, and a butterfly union at the intersection of Runeberginkatu and Mannerheimintie, 60.1817°N 24.9273°E. These are probably the northernmost unions in the world.

Germany

 Cologne has one grand union at the stop Aachener Straße / Gürtel at 50°56′13.2″N 6°54′30.4″E, and one 3/4 grand union at Barbarossaplatz 50°55′42.9″N 6°56′33.7″E
 Cottbus has one grand union at 51°45′39.86″N 14°19′51.39″E and a 3/4 grand union at 51°44′57.54″N 14°19′42.50″E.
 Dresden has a grand union at 51°3′49.47″N 13°44′48.95″E (Albertplatz); a 5/8 grand union at 51°3′47.55″N 13°44′13.53″E there is only a single connection on the north route, and a butterfly union at 51°2′58.09″N 13°44′39.27″E (Dresden HBf)
 Duisburg has a butterfly union at 51°30′7.44″N 6°45′25.78″E
 Kiel had a half union on Berliner Platz.
 Erfurt has a butterfly union at 50.976099°N 11.034358°E, its modern city center: the Anger.
 Karlsruhe's system has three grand unions located at Stop Mathystrasse (49°0′8.96″N 8°23′39.77″E), located at Entenfang (49°00′37.1″N 8°21′31.8″E)., and the third one established in 2018 at intersection Rüppurrer Str. and Baumeisterstr. A fourth one is planned at the next intersection of Kriegsstr. and Baumeisterstr.
 Kassel's system has a single grand union located at 51°19′4.87″N 9°30′1.02″E and a 3/4 grand union at 51°18′43.02″N 9°29′29.64″E.
 Leipzig has a grand union at 51°20′39.35″N 12°22′15.99″E it is unique in interfacing with four tracks at Goerdelerring tram stop. There is a 3/4 grand union at 51°19′56.49″N 12°20′19.68″E, a half union at 51°20′31.31″N 12°21′31.15″E and butterfly unions at 51°19′12.95″N 12°19′48.80″E,  51°20′20.36″N 12°21′44.96″E and 51°21′44.93″N 12°21′55.79″.
 Munich has one real grand union at Ostfriedhof since the last track alteration in 2015 at 48°07′8.6″N 11°35′1″E. While not a traditional grand union, the Munich tram system has also a "Grand circle" which has the same route function as a grand union and also provides a loop for all lines, it is located at Maxmonument in Maximilianstrasse, 48°8′15.27″N, 11°35′17.02″E.

Italy
 Milan: the Milan tram network currently has two grand unions. The first is a non standard design with divided North South tracks around a monument located at piazza 24 Maggio, and the second located nearby at piazzale Porta Lodovica.  There used to be another large one until the 1990s located at piazza della Repubblica, but it has since reduced to a wye junction still keeping the layout of diverging routes by the removal of the straight route to via Vittor Pisani.

Netherlands
 Amsterdam, Netherlands: , the Amsterdam tram system continues to have four grand unions. However, none of them has tram routes running in all directions under normal operation.  They are located at 52°21′17.39″N 4°54′4.49″E; 52°21′45.91″N 4°52′31.04″E and 52°22′12.13″N 4°51′0.94″E. and 52°21′9.99″N 4°53′28.04″E;
Rotterdam: the Rotterdam tram system has one three-quarter union, located at Vasteland - Westzeedijk 51°91′14.94″N, 4°47′74.85″E;
 The Hague: The Hague tram system has one butterfly union at the crossing of the Laan van Meerdervoort and the Koningin Emmakade/Waldeck Pyrmontkade (S100), (52°04′54.1″N 4°17′15.9″E). There is also a half union at the crossing of the Loosduinseweg and the Monstersestraat, (52°04′22.2″N 4°17′30.5″E)

Poland
 Kraków has three grand unions, one at 50°3′27.42″N 19°57′32.40″E one at 50°3′23.40″N 19°56′43.63″E and one at 50°4′46.65″N 20°1′38.49″E. There is a "Grand Circle" at Centralny Square,  50°4′19.56″N 20°2′14.46″E, the "Grand Circle" which has the same route function as a grand union and also provides a loop for all lines.  There is a 3/4 union at 50°3′6.26″N 19°56′30.22″E and a 5/8 union at 50°4′24.31″N 20°1′2.89″E.
 Poznań: The Poznań Tram system has 6 grand unions, which may be the most extant in any city.  They are located at: 52°24′37.94″N, 16°54′48.53″E; 52°24′28.02″N, 16°54′44.97″E; 52°24′9.54″N, 16°53′20.65″E; 52°23′24.39″N, 16°53′39.07″E; 52°22′48.68″N, 16°56′35.21″E and 52°23′57.53″N, 16°57′8.97″E.  All can be seen in detail on Google Earth.
 Warsaw: The Warsaw system has two grand unions, first at 52°14′30.79″N 20°59′37.00″E and second at 52°14′13.30″N 20°58′48.62″E. There is a 3/4 union at 52°15′17.24″N 20°58′57.11″E.

Russia
 Kazan: Kazan Tram system had one grand union. It is located at 55.780459 N, 49.112853 E. Street View in Google Earth shows that this Grand Union has been partially removed, portions still remain in the pavement in 2013.
 Moscow: Moscow Tram system has one 3/4 union on Preobrazhenskaya Ploshad
 Saint-Petersburg: Saint-Petersburg Tram system has one 3/4 union on Svetlanovskaya Ploshad
Angarsk: Angarsk Tram system had one Full grand union which was partially dismounted in 2000-s

Slovakia
 Košice, had one grand union at 48°42′18″N 21°14′35″E, in 2018 that was replaced with a Grand Circle, which can be seen on Google Earth.

Switzerland
 Basle, The Basle system has a grand union at 47 33' 48.62"N 7 35' 57.96"E and a (nonstandard) grand union located at 47°33′4.83″N 7°35′41.89″E.

United Kingdom
 The UK had at least four grand unions, at Salford, South Shields, Liverpool, and Walthamstow.  The components of the Salford union are presently stored at the National Tramway Museum at Crich.

Americas

Canada
 Edmonton: The Edmonton Radial Railway had a single grand union at the intersection of 109th Street and Jasper Avenue, although one side of the junction remained as a stub and was removed by the late 1930s.
 Montreal: The system operated by Montreal Tramways Company (Montreal street railway system) had several grand unions, with one known to be at the intersection of Ste. Catherine and St. Lawrence Streets. 

 Toronto: The most extensive street railway system in the Americas is the Toronto streetcar system of the Toronto Transit Commission in southern Ontario, which has many four-way streetcar intersections, including the only extant grand unions remaining in the Western Hemisphere. The system includes three grand unions, one 7/8 union (one curve short of a grand union), four three-quarter unions (missing 2 curves at a single corner), three more unions with 6 curves and many unions in various configurations with less than 6 curves. The "traditional" grand unions are located at Bathurst and King (43°38′38.14″N 79°24′9.50″W); Spadina and King (43°38′43.73″N 79°23′42.09″W) and Spadina and Queen (43°38′55.43″N 79°23′46.91″W). King and Dufferin (43°38′20.15″N 79°25′38.45″W) is a "7/8 union": it is missing the curve from southbound to westbound.
 Brantford, Ontario The Brantford Municipal Railway installed a UK-made grand union at Colborne and Market Streets circa 1910.  It remained in service until the end of streetcar service in the city on 31 January 1940. It was taken up for scrap in 1940.

United States
 Akron: The Akron streetcar system had one grand union at the intersection of Main and Exchange Streets,
 Boston: The Boston Elevated Railway had four grand unions on Washington Street, at Hanover Street, Boylston and Essex Streets, Southampton Street, and Dover Street. Dover Street was also a part of another, albeit asymmetrical, grand union where it intersected Tremont Street and terminated into Berkeley Street, leading to another grand union at the intersection of Berkeley and Columbus Avenue. Another grand union existed at the intersection of Massachusetts Avenue and Huntington Avenue. An eighth grand union had existed at Dewey Square.
 Chicago: The Chicago Transit Authority has a three-quarter union at Tower 18, located on the northwest corner of The Loop. This union has the notable distinctions of not only being built entirely on elevated bridgework over the streets below, but also being fully equipped with third rails for power distribution.
 Philadelphia: SEPTA has a surviving example of a half union located at the intersection of Chester Avenue and 49th Street; and PTC previously had two butterfly unions, the first at Erie Ave and Old York Road and the second at Lancaster Avenue and 33rd Street; as well as a second half union at Allegheny and 22nd Street.
 Pittsburgh: Pittsburgh's trolley system had a 3/4 union located at the intersection of 5th Avenue and Craig St.
 Rochester, New York: Rochester's surface streetcar system had three full grand unions, all of which were located on Main Street, as well as two three-quarter unions, and three half unions.
 Seattle: The Seattle-Tacoma Interurban was believed to have a single grand union, located at N. 34th St. and Fremont Ave.
 San Francisco: The San Francisco Municipal Railway's light rail line has a quarter union at 4th Street and King Street. The N Judah route crosses 4th, and the current T Third route uses the turn connecting the tracks on King northwest of the intersection to those on 4th to the southwest; the tracks on 4th across King lead to the Central Subway, which is planned to carry the T Third when it opens.
 Salt Lake City: The Utah Transit Authority's TRAX system has 2 half grand unions(Main Street Interlocking at 40°45′38.2″N 111°53′28.3″W and the Airport Junction Interlocking at 40°46′09.7″N 111°54′08.4″W), 1 quarter grand union (Union Interlocking at 40°43′21.1″N 111°53′48.8″W), and a three interlocking combination that offers the effect of a half grand union (Lovendahl/Ephraim/Sugar Interlockings at 40°37′56.2″N 111°53′54.7″W).

Galleries

Australasia

 Adelaide, Australia: The 1908-1958 electric tram system had three grand unions, located at King William Street and North Terrace, King William and Wakefield Streets (Victoria Square), and at Pulteney and Wakefield Streets.
 Auckland, New Zealand: The Auckland system formerly had two grand unions, located at Queen Street's intersections with both Customs Street and Wellesley Street.
 Melbourne, Australia: The only surviving grand union in the Southern Hemisphere is Balaclava Junction on the Melbourne tram system, in Australia.  It is located at 37°52′21.56″S 145°1′29.01″E. There is also a ¾ Grand Union Junction at the interserction of Victoria Parade and Nicholson Street, East Melbourne.

See also 

 Diamond crossing

References 

Rail junction types